Inape lojae is a species of moth of the family Tortricidae. It is found in Loja Province, Ecuador.

The ground colour of the forewings is brownish yellow, dotted with black. The hindwings are cream, slightly tinged with brownish and spotted with brownish grey.

Etymology
The species name refers to the type locality.

References

Moths described in 2008
Endemic fauna of Ecuador
Moths of South America
lojae
Taxa named by Józef Razowski